= Apatampa =

Traditional dance of the Fanti

Apatampa is a dance performed by the Fanti people in Ghana. Historically, It is believed that, the name of the dance was derived from an incident that happened a long time ago where a giant used to attack and kill Fanti men at night. One night, when the giant was fighting the last man, a woman appeared and danced gracefully to distract the giant. She was praised for ending the fight (apata ampa).

== Instruments ==
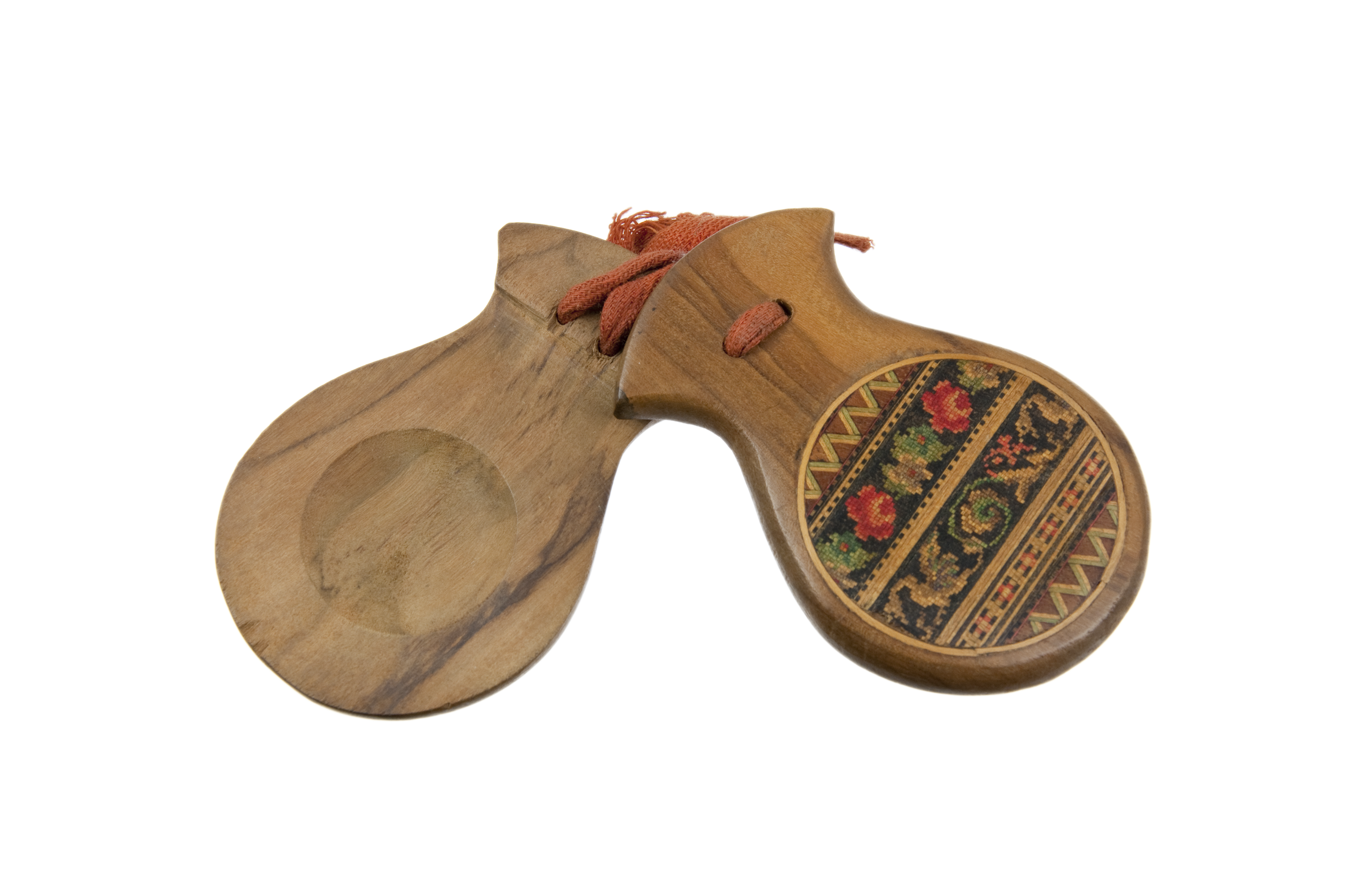

Instruments used in performing the Apatampa include a large rectangular plywood sheet where drummers strike the open surface with their palms; a pitch metal whistle (aben) and castanet (afrikyiwa).

== Performance ==
The dance starts with the individual creating a beat by hitting both thighs with both hands twice and clapping on the third beat. The performer then beats their chest twice on the fourth and fifth beats. This is performed with a smile and cheerful expression while moving. The dance follows the rhythm of the instruments.
